Rancho Agua Caliente might refer to;

 Rancho Agua Caliente (Higuera), a Mexican land grant in Alameda County, California
 Rancho Agua Caliente (Pina), a Mexican land grant in Sonoma County, California